Hüseyin Doğan (born 22 January 1994) is a Dutch professional footballer who plays as a midfielder.

Club career
He came through the Sparta Rotterdam youth system and made his senior debut for them in September 2012 against Go Ahead Eagles.

Without a club for a year after Sparta released him in 2016, Doğan signed with FC Oss ahead of the 2017–18 season.

On 29 July 2019, Doğan signed for NAC Breda.

On 29 March 2021, Doğan signed for FC Istiklol on a one-year contract following a trial with the club. On 7 June 2021, Istiklol announced that Doğan had left the club by mutual consent.

On 22 September 2021, Doğan returned to TOP Oss.

Personal life
Born in the Netherlands, Doğan is of Turkish descent.

Career statistics

Club

Honours

Club
Sparta Rotterdam
 Eerste Divisie: 2015–16

Istiklol
 Tajik Supercup: 2021

References

External links
 
 
 
 

1994 births
Living people
Footballers from The Hague
Association football midfielders
Dutch footballers
Netherlands youth international footballers
Dutch people of Turkish descent
Sparta Rotterdam players
TOP Oss players
NAC Breda players
Eerste Divisie players
TFF Second League players
Dutch expatriate footballers
Expatriate footballers in Tajikistan
Dutch expatriate sportspeople in Tajikistan
Expatriate footballers in Turkey
Dutch expatriate sportspeople in Turkey